The Municipality of Mokronog-Trebelno is a municipality in Slovenia. The municipality was created in 2006, when it seceded from the Municipality of Trebnje. It is part of the traditional province of Lower Carniola. The municipality is now included in the Southeast Slovenia Statistical Region. Its seat is the settlement of Mokronog.

Settlements
In addition to the municipal seat of Mokronog, the municipality also includes the following settlements:

 Beli Grič
 Bitnja Vas
 Bogneča Vas
 Brezje pri Trebelnem
 Brezovica pri Trebelnem
 Bruna Vas
 Cerovec pri Trebelnem
 Češnjice pri Trebelnem
 Cikava
 Čilpah
 Čužnja Vas
 Dolenje Laknice
 Dolenje Zabukovje
 Drečji Vrh
 Gorenja Vas pri Mokronogu
 Gorenje Laknice
 Gorenje Zabukovje
 Gorenji Mokronog
 Hrastovica
 Jagodnik
 Jelševec
 Križni Vrh
 Log
 Maline
 Martinja Vas pri Mokronogu
 Mirna Vas
 Most
 Ornuška Vas
 Ostrožnik
 Podturn
 Pugled pri Mokronogu
 Puščava
 Radna Vas
 Ribjek
 Roje pri Trebelnem
 Slepšek
 Srednje Laknice
 Štatenberk
 Sveti Vrh
 Trebelno
 Velika Strmica
 Vrh pri Trebelnem

History
Tombs dating to the Early Iron Age have been discovered on a number of sites in the municipality.

Notable people
Notable people that were born or lived in the area of the Municipality of Mokronog-Trebelno include:
Franc Serafin Metelko (1779–1860), philologist
Martin Strel (born 1954), long distance swimmer

References

External links

 Municipality of Mokronog–Trebelno at Geopedia
 Mokronog-Trebelno municipal website

 
Mokronog-Trebelno
Mirna Valley
2006 establishments in Slovenia